Neoschumannia kamerunensis is a species of plant in the family Apocynaceae. It is found in Cameroon, Central African Republic, and Ivory Coast. Its natural habitat is subtropical or tropical moist lowland forests. It is threatened by habitat loss.

References

External links
 

Asclepiadoideae
Flora of Cameroon
Flora of the Central African Republic
Flora of Ivory Coast
Critically endangered flora of Africa
Plants described in 1905
Taxonomy articles created by Polbot